Mukul Roy  (born 17 April 1954) is an Indian politician from West Bengal belonging to the All India Trinamool Congress.  He has also served as a Minister of State in the Shipping Ministry and later Ministry of Railways during the second UPA government. Before the creation of Trinamool Congress, he was a member of Indian National Congress. Between 2017 and 2021, Roy left Trinamool Congress to join Bharatiya Janata Party.

After Mamata Banerjee resigned as the Railway Minister to become the Chief Minister of West Bengal, Roy was handed additional charge of the Ministry of Railways after Mamata expressed her desire that her party retain the Ministry of Railways and personally recommended Roy to Prime Minister Manmohan Singh.

He had resigned from Trinamool Congress on 25 September 2017; later he was suspended from the party for six years for anti-party activities. He also resigned from Rajya Sabha membership on 11 October 2017. He rejoined All India Trinamool Congress on 11 June 2021 along with his son in presence of Mamata Banerjee.

Educational qualifications
He did his Bachelor of Science from Calcutta University. He also earned an MA degree in public administration from the Madurai Kamaraj University in 2006.

Political career
 
Roy started his political career as Youth Congress leader and became close to Mamata Banerjee who was also associated with Youth Congress.

All India Trinamool Congress

Roy was a founding member of All India Trinamool Congress which was formed in January 1998 as a breakaway faction of the Indian National Congress led by Mamata Banerjee. Soon, he became the party's face in New Delhi and was made general secretary in 2006.

In 2001 West Bengal Legislative Assembly election, he was TMC candidate from Jagatdal constituency and got 56,741 votes but lost.

In April 2006, Roy was elected to Rajya Sabha and was a leader of All India Trinamool Congress from 28 May 2009 to 20 March 2012 in Rajya Sabha. In UPA II was appointed Minister of State in the Ministry of Shipping first, then Minister of State in the Ministry of Railways when Mamata Banerjee resigned.

On 11 July 2011, when Prime Minister Manmohan Singh directed Mukul Roy to visit the site of the derailment of the Guwahati-Puri Express in Assam, he openly defied him. This brought a lot of displeasure among the political circles and he was shunted out of the Railways portfolio in the latest cabinet reshuffle on 12 July 2011.

In 2012, he was the subject of a controversy regarding the Railway Budget. This happened after Mamata Banerjee expressed her discontent with the increase in passenger fares, and demanded the resignation of Dinesh Trivedi, Railway Minister.

 
After Dinesh resigned, Mukul became the Railway Minister of India and he removed the fare hike introduced by the former Railway Minister Dinesh Trivedi, to much criticism. With the exit of Trinamool from UPA coalition due to an allowance of 51% FDI in retail and aviation sector, Mukul Roy's tenure of railway minister came to an end in the month of September 2012.

Roy ran a special train called "DU Gyan Uday Express" a Bengali worded statement, which took 1000 students of Delhi University to places like Ahmedabad, Mumbai, Goa and Bangalore during the summer break of 2012.

An application has been submitted to the Election Commission for the formation of the new political party called All India Trinamool Congress and Mukul aide Amitabha Majumdar has been named as the President. The head office of the party is located in Dinhata, in North Bengal.

Roy and Mamata had a fall out in 2015 when his name came up in Saradha scam as well as in Narada sting operation in which TMC leaders are involved.

Roy was suspended from the party for six years as he met senior BJP leaders like Finance Minister Arun Jaitley and BJP general secretary Kailash Vijayvargiya. He has resigned from Trinamool Congress on 25 September 2017. After that Roy also resigned from Rajya Sabha membership on 11 October 2017.

Bharatiya Janata Party

Roy formally joined the Bharatiya Janata Party on 3 November 2017. Upon joining the party, he said that he felt proud of working under Prime Minister Narendra Modi.
He successfully contested the 2021 West Bengal Legislative Assembly election and won.

"Rejoining" Trinamool Congress
On 11 June 2021, Roy rejoined the All India Trinamool Congress along with his son Subhranshu Roy in the presence of Mamata Banerjee and others.
On 25 June 2021, he was elected as a member of PAC by the speaker of West Bengal Legislative Assembly and later became the chairman of the PAC on 14 July 2021.

Roy set foot in Krishnanagar, his constituency. He first came to Krishnanagar Bhatjangla on 27 June 2021. He was then greeted by All India Trinamool Congress activists wearing a wreath. Soon after, a quarrel broke out between All India Trinamool Congress activists over the reception of Mukul Roy.

On 19 January 2022, his lawyer told the Speaker that he is still in the BJP and he never rejoined the ruling Trinamool Congress party. Accordingly, the Speaker dismissed Roy's disqualification as legislator under anti-defection law.

References

External links
 Profile on Rajya Sabha website

Living people
Indian anti-communists
Trinamool Congress politicians from West Bengal
University of Calcutta alumni
Madurai Kamaraj University alumni
West Bengal politicians
1954 births
Railway Ministers of India
Rajya Sabha members from West Bengal
People from North 24 Parganas district
Politicians from Kolkata
Members of the Cabinet of India
20th-century Indian politicians
21st-century Indian politicians
Bharatiya Janata Party politicians from West Bengal
Indian National Congress politicians from West Bengal
West Bengal MLAs 2021–2026